The 2016–17 Texas Tech Lady Raiders basketball team will represent Texas Tech University in the 2016–17 NCAA Division I women's basketball season. The Lady Raiders, led by fourth year head coach Candi Whitaker, played their homes games at United Supermarkets Arena and were members of the Big 12 Conference. They finished the season 14–17, 5–13 in Big 12 play to finish in eighth place. They advanced to the quarterfinals of the Big 12 women's tourament where they lost to Baylor.

2016–17 media

Television & Radio information
Select Lady Raiders games will be shown on FSN affiliates throughout the season, including FSSW, FSSW+, and FCS Atlantic, Central, and Pacific. All games will be broadcast on the Lady Raiders Radio Network on either KLZK or KJTV.

Roster

Schedule

|-
!colspan=12 style="background:#CC0000; color:black;"| Exhibition

|-
!colspan=12 style="background:#CC0000; color:black;"| Non-conference regular season

|-
!colspan=12 style="background:#CC0000; color:black;"| Big 12 regular season

|-
!colspan=12 style="background:#CC0000; color:black;"|  Big 12 Women's Tournament

See also
2016–17 Texas Tech Red Raiders basketball team

References

Texas Tech Lady Raiders basketball seasons
Texas Tech